John Edmonds  may refer to:

Politics
John Edmonds (died 1544), MP for Maldon
John Edmonds (died 1606), MP for Cambridge
John Edmonds (bef. 1563/6-?1611/12), MP for Kingston upon Hull
John W. Edmonds (1799–1874), American lawyer and politician in New York
John Edmonds (Kansas politician) (born 1951), American politician

Others
John Edmonds (artist) (born 1989)
John Edmonds (trade unionist) (born 1944), British former trade union official
Jack Edmonds (born 1934), mathematician
John Samuel Edmonds (1799–1865), New Zealand missionary, trader, stonemason and founding father
John Maxwell Edmonds (1875–1958), classicist

See also
John Edmands (disambiguation)
John Edmond (disambiguation)
John Edmondson (disambiguation)
John Edmunds (disambiguation)